The 2009 Indy Racing League Firestone Indy Lights season began April 4 in St. Petersburg, Florida, where it ran a double-header weekend in support to the season-opening IndyCar Series event. The schedule took place over 14 race weekends in support of the IndyCars, with 15 total races. Unlike the 2008 season, the St. Petersburg weekend will be the only double-header the series has announced. J. R. Hildebrand ended the season as champion for Andretti Green-AFS Racing, winning the championship by nearly 100 points ahead of Vision Racing's James Davison and his AGR-AFS Racing team-mate Sebastián Saavedra.

Drivers and teams
All drivers compete in Firestone-shod Dallaras.

Schedule
The season consisted of fifteen races, including a mix of ovals, temporary street circuits and road courses.

Race summaries

St. Pete 100 Race 1
 Saturday April 4, 2009
 Streets of St. Petersburg, St. Petersburg, Florida
 Race weather: 79 °F, partly cloudy
 Pole position winner: #26 J. R. Hildebrand 1:07.7704 sec, 
 Race Summary: The league instituted new qualifying rules for the road courses in 2009. First, the cars were broken into two groups due to the increase in the size of the field, the fastest driver in either session would start from the pole and the other drivers in his session would line up in the odd-numbered positions for the race in order of speed while the drivers from the slower session would line up in the even-numbered positions. In addition, the league abandoned its practice of using partially inverted finishing order from race 1 of a doubleheader to determine the grid for race 2. Instead a separate qualifying session was held for the second race (which actually occurred before the first race had been held).

J. R. Hildebrand opened up a lead as wide as 6 seconds during the first half of the race on his pursuers led by teammate Sebastián Saavedra and Junior Strous. On lap 18, a caution came out caused by Duncan Tappy spinning off-track and dragging debris onto the racing surface. On the restart, Hildebrand was unable to bring his car to full power due to an electrical issue and Strous was able to make the pass in turns 1 and 2 while making slight contact with Hildebrand's car. Jonathan Summerton was able to make his way past in a subsequent corner. However, Summerton was unable to challenge Strous for the victory, with Junior Strous capturing his first victory in his debut and the first major open wheel racing victory for team principal Paul Diatlovich (of PDM Racing).

St. Pete 100 Race 2
 Sunday April 5, 2009
 Streets of St. Petersburg, St. Petersburg, Florida
 Race weather:  82 °F, mostly cloudy
 Pole position winner: #27 Sebastián Saavedra 1:07.2171 sec, 
 Race Summary: J. R. Hildebrand led the field through lap one but it was ordered that he had jumped the start and was sent back to third position and his teammate polesitter Sebastián Saavedra assumed the lead. On lap 13 the most spectacular incident occurred when Ali Jackson and Pippa Mann tangled in turn 8 resulting in Jackson's car being wedged under Mann's and Mann's rear wheels sitting several feet in the air as she gunned the throttle attempting to get going. Both cars were ultimately able to continue but Mann soon suffered suspension failure and fell out of the race. On a lap 27 restart, J. R. Hildebrand who was running second suffered the same electrical issues he had the day before. He swung wide to let Junior Strous through on the inside into turn 1, but Ana Beatriz who was running behind Strous also dove for the open real estate and made contact with Hildebrand, taking both cars out. On the ensuing restart on lap 33, Strous was able to pass Hildebrand's teammate Saavedra going into turn 1 for the lead as Ali Jackson and teammate Jesse Mason crashed behind them bringing out another caution. Strous held off Saavedra on the restart on lap 37 and drove to his second victory of the weekend, becoming the third Indy Lights driver to sweep the St. Pete doubleheader after Raphael Matos (2006) and Alex Lloyd (2007).

Long Beach 100
 Sunday April 19, 2009
 Streets of Long Beach, Long Beach, California
 Race weather: 84 °F, sunny
 Pole position winner: #26 J. R. Hildebrand 1:15.2695 sec, 
 Race Summary:

Kansas Lottery 100
 Sunday April 26, 2009
 Kansas Speedway, Kansas City, Kansas
 Race weather: 72 °F, Cloudy and Windy
 Pole position winner: #11 Wade Cunningham, 58.3812 sec,  (2-lap)
 Race Summary: Due to the prospect of bad weather in the area, the race was moved up 2 hours to 10 AM local time. Heavy storms had moved through the area the previous night, leaving a "green" racetrack and gusty winds. The challenging conditions led to a number of  major incidents in the race. The first occurred on lap 3 when Jesse Mason spun and was hit by Richard Philippe, both were uninjured. On the lap 9 restart Sebastián Saavedra was able to pass polesitter Wade Cunningham for the lead. The scariest incident of the day occurred on lap 15 when Ali Jackson hit the outside wall and Sergey Mokshantsev was unable to slow down due to a mechanical problem and ran into the back of Rodrigo Barbosa, flipping Mokshantsev's car upside down and into the wall. Despite the hard and unusual impact, Mokshantsev, as well as the other two drivers, was also uninjured. Saavedra was able to hold off the challenges of Cunningham until on lap 59, Dillon Battistini spun and collected Pippa Mann, who pierced Battistini's radiator, leaving a large amount of fluid on the track and resulting in the race ending under caution. Saavedra captured his first Indy Lights victory in his third start and his first on an oval.

Firestone Freedom 100
 Friday May 22, 2009
 Indianapolis Motor Speedway, Speedway, Indiana
 Race weather: 83 °F, Sunny
 Pole position winner: #11 Wade Cunningham, 1:34.6485 sec,  (2-lap)
 Race Summary:

Husar's House of Fine Diamonds 100
 Sunday May 31, 2009
 Milwaukee Mile, West Allis, Wisconsin
 Race weather: 57 °F, Partially cloudy
 Pole position winner: #5 Mario Romancini, 49.4453 sec,  (2-lap)
 Race Summary: Mario Romancini led from the pole and was closely pursued by the AGR-AFS Racing cars of J. R. Hildebrand and Sebastián Saavedra. However, Saavedra got caught up in an incident where Jonathan Summerton spun and dropped to the back. He elected to save his tires during what ultimately became a long green-flag run. In the last few laps Saavedra was able to use his better handling car to work through the field and back up to third place. However, he was unable to pass his teammate or Romancini and Romancini captured his first Indy Lights victory leading every lap.

Miller Lite 100
 Saturday June 20, 2009
 Iowa Speedway, Newton, Iowa
 Race weather:
 Pole position winner: #26 J. R. Hildebrand, 39.9348 sec,  (2-lap)
 Race Summary:  After dueling early with J. R. Hildebrand, Wade Cunningham took the lead on lap 4 and controlled the majority of the race.  The car of Sergey Mokshantsev slowed on the track on lap 5, prompting a caution to tow the car into the pits.  Pippa Mann spun on lap 53 ending a long green flag run, which was soon followed by an incident between the cars of Andrew Prendeville and Brandon Wagner.  Hildebrand, running second, was forced to serve a drive through penalty for blocking Daniel Herrington, which dropped him to ninth before recovering to finish second.  No car was able to challenge Cunningham through much of the race, with the lead pack primarily running single-file.  While running second Herrington spun but did not come into contact with the wall or another car, conceding second place to Ana Beatriz.  Sebastián Saavedra, who had to pit at the start of the race due to a mechanical issue, ran with the lead pack despite being many laps down.  His car got ahead of Cunningham's, but soon after began to impede Cunningham and cause him to lose much of his lead and Beatriz was able to overtake Cunningham.  On the last lap of the race, a collision between James Davison and Pippa Mann sealed Beatriz's victory by bringing out the caution.  Mann's car was overturned in the accident, but she was unhurt in the incident.

Corning 100
 Saturday July 4, 2009
 Watkins Glen International, Watkins Glen, New York
 Race weather: 65 °F, Partially cloudy
 Pole position winner: #21 James Davison, 1:37.1780 sec, 
 Race Summary: James Davison was able to keep Sebastián Saavedra who started alongside him behind at the start. On lap 8, James Hinchcliffe who was running fourth spun in turn 6, causing light damage to the car. On the lap 10 restart J. R. Hildebrand was able to pass his teammate Saavedra for second and on lap 14 took the lead from Davison. On lap 27, Wade Cunningham nosed into the tires at turn 13, leaving a one-lap shootout for the checkered flag. On the final lap, Felipe Guimarães and Charlie Kimball were able to pass Saavedra for 3rd and 4th respectively with Kimball and Saavedra banging wheels on the entrance to the "Bus Stop" chicane. Saavedra was penalized 30 seconds for the contact, dropping him from 5th to 18th in the race results. Hildebrand became the second driver to win two races in the season (after Junior Strous) and extended his points lead to 58 points as virtually all of his closest pursuers had poor results.

Toronto 100
 Saturday July 11, 2009
 Streets of Toronto, Toronto, Ontario
 Race weather: 70 °F, damp, drying later
 Pole position winner: #27 Sebastián Saavedra, 1:04.6068 sec, 
 Race Summary: Earlier in the day a heavy rainstorm passed through the area, drenching the track. However, by the start of the race the sun was coming out and the track began to dry. However, the league had declared the race a "wet race" and all cars were to start on rain tires. On the first lap, Mario Romancini ducked into the pits to switch to slick tires, a move that every car would eventually make, however most waited until laps 8 to 10 to make their stops. Indy Lights teams do not normally make pit stops and the cars had to be jacked up by a manually powered "quick jack" one half at a time. In addition each wheel nut is held in place by a retaining pin that must be removed and replaced when changing a wheel. This, along with the fact that many teams were not prepared to make pit stops meant that most stops were over 1 minute long. However, AGR-AFS Racing's two cars, J. R. Hildebrand and Sebastián Saavedra were able to pit much faster as, according to their team owner Gary Peterson, they do practice pit stops. Hildebrand left the pits with the lead however, Saavedra's car was much faster. Once a passing lane had dried enough to attempt a pass, Saavedra worked his way past on lap 18 and drove away for his second win of the season. The race had no caution flags or major incidents and only two cars retired from the race due to mechanical issues.

Grand Prix of Edmonton
 Saturday July 25, 2009
 Rexall Speedway, Edmonton, Alberta
 Race weather:
 Pole position winner: #26 J. R. Hildebrand, 1:05.9065 sec, 
 Race Summary:

Kentucky 100
 Saturday August 1, 2009
 Kentucky Speedway, Sparta, Kentucky
 Race weather: 79 °F, partly cloudy
 Pole position winner: #26 J. R. Hildebrand (qualifying cancelled; field set by owner points)
 Race Summary:

 * Race finished under caution.

Mid-Ohio 100
 Sunday August 9, 2009
 Mid-Ohio Sports Car Course, Lexington, Ohio
 Race weather: 82 °F, hazy
 Pole position winner: #21 James Davison, 1:14.8673 sec, 
 Race Summary:

Carneros 100
 Sunday August 23, 2009
 Infineon Raceway, Sonoma, California
 Race weather: 62 °F, overcast
 Pole position winner: #26 J. R. Hildebrand, 1:23.0361 sec, 
 Race Summary:

Chicagoland 100
 Saturday August 29, 2009
 Chicagoland Speedway, Joliet, Illinois
 Race weather: 69 °F, mostly cloudy
 Pole position winner: #32 Brandon Wagner, 57.6140 sec,  (2-lap)
 Race Summary: With his fifth-place finish, J. R. Hildebrand became the first American champion since 2002, when A. J. Foyt IV took the honours in the inaugural Infiniti Pro Series.

Homestead-Miami 100
 Friday October 9, 2009
 Homestead-Miami Speedway, Homestead, Florida
 Race weather: 87 °F, partially cloudy
 Pole position winner: #21 James Davison, 57.6245 sec,  (2-lap)
 Race Summary:

Driver standings

 Ties in points broken by number of wins, or best finishes.

See also
 2009 IndyCar Series season
 2009 Atlantic Championship season

References

External links
 Indy Lights Series website

Indy Lights seasons
Indy Lights
Indy Lights